Big Time Movie (also known as Big Time Rush: The Movie) is a 2012 musical comedy television film based on the Nickelodeon television series, Big Time Rush and the songs of The Beatles, which aired March 10, 2012 in the United States. It features the members of Big Time Rush (a.k.a. the TV show and the band members) visiting London for their world tour, where they also have to save the world.

Big Time Movie has been viewed by over 13.1 million viewers in the USA, and become the most watched Nickelodeon original movie in Nickelodeon Latin America

Plot 
Kendall, James, Carlos, Logan, Gustavo, Kelly, Katie (Kendall's younger sister) and Jennifer (Kendall's and Katie's mom) are on their plane ride to London for first stop on their world tour. At the baggage claim in the airport, MI6 Agent Simon Lane switches identical bags with Kendall, unbeknownst to the boys, to prevent henchmen from retrieving the Beetle, a powerful device capable of reversing gravity that Lane took from evil airline mogul Atticus Moon while his henchmen take him away.

Big Time Rush check in at the Queen's Hotel and unknowingly to them, MI6 agents fail to take out the boys and they finally realize that Kendall has the wrong bag. In the same moment they also realize that MI6, Swedish spies and a mysterious woman in leather are all out to get the Beetle from them by any means necessary. The woman in leather is revealed as Penny, daughter of Agent Lane, and the band sets out with Penny in a black spy van with an AI to rescue her father, while Gustavo and Kelly worry about what the boys are up to like causing trouble while they are away from them.

Meanwhile, Gustavo and Kelly are mad at the boys for being late for their soundcheck rehearsal, and end up doing their best to find them. Meanwhile, for the story line of Katie and Mrs. Knight, they were having their pastime with the Duke Of Bath which Katie really wants her mom to fall in love with over the pastime so Katie can become a princess like in her dream. 
While everyone's busy, (Gustavo and Kelly being tortured at the MI6 HQ) and (Katie and Mrs. Knight having pastime with the Duke Of Bath), the guys, including Penny disguise themselves so they could get past Moon's crew through the park so they could carefully get to the soundcheck. They don't really get to the park safely-they get into problems, like being chased by fans, being chased by a dog, and more. After the boys finish their soundcheck, they meet up with Penny backstage and rush to the field where Moon's helicopter landed.

The MI6 Agency figure out Moon's plan and try to stop him but can't because Moon is jamming communication signals so no one gets in his way. The boys realize that Carlos' dream of becoming international super spies and singing the Beatles' is coming true so they follow Carlos' plan to stop Moon. After the boys manage to defeat Moon and save Katie, the MI6 agents arrive at the scene to give the boys a helicopter ride to Hyde Park just in time for the boys to finally start their world tour.

After they finished their first stop on their world tour concert, Gustavo finally allowed the boys to go anywhere, including visiting every single tourist spot in London that they wished to visit. While the boys realized they don't have a ride, Penny and Agent Lane come back and offer them a ride. As the boys agree to ride one more time, they ride off and disappear into the night.

Cast 

 Kendall Schmidt as Kendall Knight
 James Maslow as James Diamond
 Carlos Pena Jr. as Carlos Garcia
 Logan Henderson as Logan Mitchell
 Ciara Bravo as Katie Knight
 Challen Cates as Mrs. Knight
 Stephen Kramer Glickman as Gustavo Rocque
 Tanya Chisholm as Kelly Wainwright
 Emma Lahana as Penelope "Penny" Lane
 Teach Grant as the Concert Promoter
 Christopher Shyer as Agent Lane, an MI6 agent.
 Bob Poelking as the Pesky Government Teacher
 Trevor Devall as Sir Atticus Moon, a millionaire businessman and the main antagonist.
 John DeSantis as Maxwell, henchman of Atticus Moon.
 Michael Adamthwaite as Rikard
 Tahmoh Penikett as MI6 "Agent A"
 Garry Chalk as MI6 agent #1 	
 Emily Holmes as MI6 agent #2

Release 
The film premiered on March 9, 2012 in Canada, and on May 26, 2012 in the United Kingdom and Ireland. Big Time Movie averaged 4.1 million total viewers and ranked as the week's (3/4/12-3/11/12) number-one telecast with kids 2-11 (6.1/2.2 million), kids 6-11 (8.9/1.9 million) and tweens 9-14 (8.2/1.7 million). Over the whole weekend, Big Time Movie reached over 13.1 million total viewers.

The film was released on DVD on August 28, 2012, together with Rags.

Soundtrack 

The Big Time Movie Soundtrack is the official soundtrack of the movie which features six songs from the Beatles. It was released on March 6, 2012. Because it sold over 10,000 copies in its first week, it debuted at number 44 on the top 200 charts in March, and also reached number 2 on the iTunes Pop Albums chart.

Track listing 
The movie contains cover versions of several songs from the Beatles:
 "Help!" (The Beatles cover)
 "We Can Work It Out" (The Beatles cover)
 "Revolution" (The Beatles cover)
 "A Hard Day's Night" (The Beatles cover)

Accolades 
The movie received a nomination at the 65th Directors Guild of America Awards for Outstanding Directing in a Children's Program.

References

External links 

 

2012 television films
2012 films
Nickelodeon original films
American musical comedy films
Canadian musical comedy films
English-language Canadian films
Films based on television series
2010s musical comedy films
Films directed by Savage Steve Holland
Films scored by Guy Moon
2010s spy comedy films
Big Time Rush
2012 comedy films
Films set in London
American rock music films
Canadian rock music films
Films about singers
Films shot in Vancouver
2010s English-language films
2010s American films
2010s Canadian films